This is a list of electricity-generating power stations in the U.S. state of Illinois, sorted by type and name. In 2021, Illinois had a total summer capacity of 45,879 MW through all of its power plants. In 2022, Illinois had a net generation of 192,443 GWh.  That year, the corresponding electrical energy generation mix was (approximately) 51.4% nuclear, 21.2% coal, 12.6% natural gas, 12% wind, and 1.5% solar.

Illinois generated more energy from its six nuclear power stations than any other U.S. state in 2019.  Legislation in 2016 and 2021 provided state financial incentives which delayed the closure of several plants.

Nuclear plants

Fossil-fuel plants

Coal

Only one of three original units remains in operation as of 2017. 
Unit 1 remains operational, as Unit 2 has been shuttered since 2016.

Natural gas

Renewable plants
Data from the U.S. Energy Information Administration serves as a general reference.

Wind

Solar photovoltaic

Hydroelectric

Biomass

Energy storage

Proposed power stations

Closed/Cancelled stations

See also

List of power stations in the United States

References

External links
NRG Energy
AmerenEnergy Generating Power Plants
AU Fact sheet
DOE EIA Inventory of Electric Utility Power Plants in the United States 2000
Dynegy Power Generation Facility
Dominion Energy
Annual Report

Power stations in illinois
Power stations
Illinois